The  84th Training Command ("Railsplitters") is a formation of the United States Army. During World War I it was designated the 84th Division, American Expeditionary Forces; during World War II it was known as the 84th Infantry Division. From 1946 to 1952, the division was a part of the United States Army Reserve as the 84th Airborne Division. In 1959, the division was reorganized and redesignated once more as the 84th Division. The division was headquartered in Milwaukee in command of over 4,100 soldiers divided into eight brigades—including an ROTC brigade—spread throughout seven states.

Changes to the U.S. Army Reserve organizations from 2005 until 2007 redesigned the unit as the 84th Training Command (Leader Readiness) and it was paired with the Army Reserve Readiness Training Center (ARRTC). The flag resided at Fort McCoy, Wisconsin. As a result of Base Realignment and Closure (BRAC) throughout the Army, the ARRTC was moved to Fort Knox, Kentucky.  The 84th Training Command (LR) underwent a command-directed move to Fort Knox, Kentucky in advance of the ARRTC in September 2008. Since the move, the 84th Training Command and ARRTC split, leaving the ARRTC with leader readiness and training support. The 84th Training Command was re-designated once again to 84th Training Command (Unit Readiness).

In September 2010, the 84th was renamed 84th Training Command and began reorganization. The 84th mission currently supports three numbered and three named training divisions – The 78th Training Division (Ft. Dix, NJ), the 86th Training Division (Ft. McCoy, WI), and the 91st Training Division (Ft. Hunter Liggett, CA), Atlantic Training Division (Ft. Dix, NJ), Great Lakes Training Division (Arlington Heights, IL), Pacific Training Division (Camp Parks, Dublin, CA)

Tradition has it that the division traces its lineage to the Illinois militia company in which a young Captain Abraham Lincoln served during the Black Hawk War of 1832. The division patch was selected to honor this legacy and the division's origin in Illinois. For this reason, the alternative nickname of "Lincoln County" Division" has been used to denote the 84th.

World War I

The division was activated in September 1917 at Camp Taylor, Kentucky. It was initially made up of enlisted draftees from Indiana and Kentucky (who chose the formation's distinctive patch and nickname), with a cadre of Regular Army, Officers Reserve Corps, and National Army officers. Later groups of enlisted men assigned to the division to replace men transferred to other units came from Ohio, North Dakota, and Montana. The division remained in training at Camp Taylor until August 1918. It was deployed to France in October 1918 to serve as a training formation for replacements which would be sent to the Western Front. At the war's end, the formation was recalled home and, without having seen combat actions, inactivated in January 1919.

Its commanders included Brig. Gen. Wilber E. Wilder (25 August 1917), Maj. Gen. Harry C. Hale (6 October 1917), Brig. Gen. Wilber E. Wilder (26 November 1917), Brig. Gen. Wilber E. Wilder (15 December 1917), Maj. Gen. Harry C. Hale (1 March 1918), Maj. Gen. Harry C. Hale (5 June 1918), Maj. Gen. Harry C. Hale (21 July 1918), Brig. Gen. Wilber E. Wilder (18 October 1918), Maj. Gen. Harry C. Hale (31 October 1918).

Order of battle

 Headquarters, 84th Division
 167th Infantry Brigade
 333rd Infantry Regiment
 334th Infantry Regiment
 326th Machine Gun Battalion
 168th Infantry Brigade
 335th Infantry Regiment
 336th Infantry Regiment
 327th Machine Gun Battalion
 159th Field Artillery Brigade
 325th Field Artillery Regiment (75 mm)
 326th Field Artillery Regiment (75 mm)
 327th Field Artillery Regiment (155 mm) 
 309th Trench Mortar Battery
 325th Machine Gun Battalion
 309th Engineer Regiment
 309th Field Signal Battalion
 Headquarters Troop, 84th Division
 309th Train Headquarters and Military Police
 309th Ammunition Train
 309th Supply Train
 309th Engineer Train
 309th Sanitary Train
 333rd, 334th, 335th, and 336th Ambulance Companies and Field Hospitals

Interwar period

The division was reconstituted in the Organized Reserve on 24 June 1921 and assigned to the state of Indiana. The headquarters was organized on 6 September 1921.

World War II
The 84th Infantry Division was ordered into active military service on 15 October 1942, at Camp Howze, Texas, about 60 miles north of Dallas. Then, it was composed of the 333rd, 334th and 335th Inf. Regts.; 325th, 326th, 327th and 909th FA Bns.; 309th Engr. Combat Bn.; 309th Med, Bn.; 84th Sig. Co.; 784th Ord. Light Maintenance Co.; 84th QM Co.; 84th Recon Troop. It embarked on 20 September 1944 and arrived in the United Kingdom on 1 October, for additional training. The division landed on Omaha Beach, 1–4 November 1944, and moved to the vicinity of Gulpen, the Netherlands, 5–12 November.

The division entered combat on 18 November with an attack on Geilenkirchen, Germany, (Operation Clipper) as part of the larger offensive in the Roer Valley, north of Aachen. Operating under the command of Lt-Gen Brian Horrocks the division was supported by British tanks of the Sherwood Rangers Yeomanry, specialist armoured units of 79th Armoured Division, and XXX Corps' artillery. Taking Geilenkirchen on 19 November, the division pushed forward to take Beeck (Geilenkirchen) and Lindern (Geilenkirchen) in the face of heavy enemy resistance, 29 November. After a short rest, the division returned to the fight, taking Wurm and Würm (Geilenkirchen), Mullendorf, 18 December, before moving to Belgium to help stem the German winter offensive (Battle of the Bulge).

Battling in snow, sleet, and rain, the division threw off German attacks, recaptured Verdenne, 24–28 December, took Beffe and Devantave (Rendeux), 4–6 January 1945, and seized La Roche, 11 January. By 16 January, the Bulge had been reduced. After a 5-day respite, the 84th resumed the offensive, taking Gouvy and Beho. On 7 February, the division assumed responsibility for the Roer River zone, between Linnich and Himmerich (near Heinsberg), and trained for the river crossing.

On 23 February 1945, the second day of Operation Grenade, the division cut across the Roer, took Boisheim and Dülken, 1 March, crossed the Niers on 2 March, took Krefeld, 3 March, and reached the Rhine by 5 March. One day before, the 'Krefeld-Uerdinger Brücke' was blown off by Wehrmacht soldiers.
The division trained along the west bank of the river in March.

After crossing the Rhine, 1 April, the division drove from Lembeck toward Bielefeld in conjunction with the 5th Armored Division, crossing the Weser River to capture Hanover, 10 April. By 13 April, it had reached the Elbe, and halted its advance, patrolling along the river. Soviet troops were contacted at Balow, 2 May 1945. The division remained on occupation duty in Germany after VE-day, returning to the United States on 19 January 1946 for demobilization. It was redesignated a reserve formation on 21 January 1946.

Troops of the 84th Infantry Division liberated two satellite camps of the Neuengamme Concentration Camp: Ahlem (a.k.a. Hannover-Ahlem), on 10 April 1945, and Salzwedel, on 14 April 1945.  As such, the 84th is officially recognized as a "Liberating Unit" by both the U.S. Army's Center of Military History and the Holocaust Memorial Museum.

Casualties
Total battle casualties: 7,260
Killed in action: 1,284
Wounded in action: 5,098
Missing in action: 129
Prisoner of war: 749
Campaigns: Rhineland, Ardennes-Alsace, Central Europe.
Days of combat: 170.
Distinguished Unit Citations: 7.
Awards: Distinguished Service Cross (United States)-12 ; Distinguished Service Medal (United States)-1 ; Silver Star-555; LM-4; SM-27 ; BSM-2,962 ; AM-59.
Commanders: Maj. Gen. John H. Hilldring (October 1942 – February 1943), Maj. Gen. Stonewall Jackson (February–October 1943), Maj. Gen. Robert B. McClure (October 1943 – March 1944), Maj. Gen. Roscoe B. Woodruff (March–June 1944), Maj. Gen. Alexander R. Bolling (June 1944 to 1946).
The 84th returned to the US in January 1946 and was inactivated at Camp Kilmer, New Jersey on January 21, 1946

Order of battle
 Headquarters, 84th Infantry Division
 333rd Infantry Regiment
 334th Infantry Regiment
 335th Infantry Regiment
 Headquarters and Headquarters Battery, 84th Infantry Division Artillery
 325th Field Artillery Battalion (105 mm)
 326th Field Artillery Battalion (105 mm)
 327th Field Artillery Battalion (155 mm)
 909th Field Artillery Battalion (105 mm)
 309th Engineer Combat Battalion
 309th Medical Battalion
 84th Cavalry Reconnaissance Troop (Mechanized)
 Headquarters, Special Troops, 84th Infantry Division
 Headquarters Company, 84th Infantry Division
 784th Ordnance Light Maintenance Company
 84th Quartermaster Company
 84th Signal Company
 Military Police Platoon
 Band
 84th Counterintelligence Corps Detachment

Assignments in European Theater of Operations
10 September 1944: Ninth Army, ETOUSA.
21 September 1944: III Corps.
4 November 1944: XIX Corps, Ninth Army, 12th Army Group.
8 November 1944: XIII Corps.
11 November 1944: Ninth Army, 12th Army Group, but attached for operations to the British XXX Corps, British Second Army, British 21st Army Group.
23 November 1944: XIII Corps, Ninth Army, 12th Army Group.
20 December 1944: Ninth Army, 12th Army Group, but attached to the XVIII (Abn) Corps of First Army, itself attached to the British 21st Army Group.
20 December 1944: VII Corps.
22 December 1944: VII Corps, First Army (attached to British 21st Army Group), 12th Army Group.
18 January 1945: VII Corps, First Army, 12th Army Group.
23 January 1945: XVIII (Abn) Corps.
3 February 1945: XIII Corps, Ninth Army (attached to British 21st Army Group), 12th Army Group.
4 April 1945: XIII Corps, Ninth Army, 12th Army Group.

Cold War to present
Following the conclusion of World War II, the division was made part of the Army Reserve. In January 1946, it was redesignated the 84th Airborne Division and headquartered out of Wisconsin. In 1947, it was designated as the Army's Airborne Reserve Command. Five years later, in 1952, the division was reorganized again, this time as a training division composed of three regiments—the 274th, 334th, and 339th. Throughout the 1950s, the division would continue its conversion to a training formation, changing its subordinate unit makeup from regiments to brigades and support groups.

On 24 January 1991, elements of the 84th Division (Training) were activated and mobilized for support roles in Operation Desert Storm. Less than three months later, on 22 March 1991, the elements were returned home. In 1993, reorganization within the Army Reserve brought about the merger between the 84th and the 85th Division (Training). The move expanded the 84th Division's area of command to include the rest of Wisconsin and Illinois, as well as all of Missouri and Iowa. Soon after, in June 1994, units from the 84th participated in peacekeeping operations as part of the multinational observer force in the Sinai, Egypt, and remained there until July 1995.

In April 1995, the formation was once more redesignated, this time as an institutional training division. This change brought with it command of units and training in the state of Nebraska. In August 1995, army reorganization further expanded the 84th's range of authority to command the fourteen U.S. Army Reserve Forces Schools in Region E—Wisconsin, Michigan, Minnesota, Illinois, Indiana, and Ohio.

In October 2004, the 84th Division (Institutional Training) underwent a major transformation. All eight brigades realigned under the 100th Division and the Headquarters and Division Band combined with the Army Reserve Readiness Training Center (ARRTC) located at Fort McCoy, Wis., to create the 84th U.S. Army Reserve Readiness Training Command (84th USARRTC). The expertise and resources from the two units gave the 84th USARRTC an edge on the type and amount of training opportunities offered. The three Army Reserve NCO academies were also realigned under the new 84th USARRTC.

In October 2006, the 84th USARRTC underwent another major transformation as 12 brigades from the Army Reserve's Institutional Training Divisions realigned under the command. The brigades were responsible for Officer Education System (OES) training, such as the Combined Arms Exercise (CAX) and Intermediate Level Education (ILE), and Senior Reserve Officer Training Corps (SROTC) support to universities across the country.

In February 2007, the 84th USARRTC was renamed the 84th Training Command (Leader Readiness) in response to the unit's transformation under the Army Reserve's Decision Point 74. The 84th Training Command had exercise command and control over three professional development brigades, one schools brigade, one training development brigade, the 84th Division Band, and eventually the Small Arms Readiness Group.

In September 2008, the 84th Training Command relocated from Milwaukee, Wisconsin and Fort McCoy, Wisconsin to Fort Knox, Kentucky.

In October 2009, the focus of the 84th Training Command shifted from leader readiness to unit readiness. The Army Reserve Readiness Training Center and the three U.S. Army Reserve NCO Academies moved from the umbrella of the 84th and became the 83rd USARRTC which reported directly to the U.S. Army Reserve Command.

In October 2010, the 84th Training Command reorganized to align with the transformation of the Army Reserve. The 84th Training Command is the executing agent of the U.S. Army Reserve's Combat Support Training Programs which includes Warrior Exercises (WAREX), Combat Support Training Exercises (CSTX). The 84th Training Command provides multiple collective training opportunities which prepare units for operational deployments worldwide.

Subordinate units
The 84th Training Command as of August 2016:
Headquarters, 84th Training Command (Fort Knox, Kentucky)
 78th Training Division (Joint Base McGuire-Dix-Lakehurst, New Jersey)
 1st Brigade (Joint Base McGuire-Dix-Lakehurst, New Jersey)
 3rd Battalion/318th Regiment (Fort Meade, Maryland)
 2nd Battalion/323rd Regiment (Lumberton, North Carolina)
 2nd Battalion/311th Regiment (Fort Bragg, North Carolina)
 3rd Battalion/309th Regiment (Liverpool, New York)
 86th Training Division (Fort McCoy, Wisconsin)
 1st Brigade OPS (Milwaukee, Wisconsin)
 1st Battalion/329th Regiment (Indianapolis, Indiana)
 3rd Battalion/397th Regiment (Whitehall, Ohio)
 2nd Battalion/383rd Regiment (Fort Leavenworth, Kansas)
 3rd Battalion/346th Regiment (Hattiesburg, Mississippi)
 91st Training Division (Fort Hunter Liggett, California)
 1st Brigade OPS (Scottsdale, Arizona)
 11th Battalion/104th Regiment (Boise, Idaho)
 2nd Battalion/378th Regiment (Salt Lake City, Utah)
 3rd Battalion/290th Regiment (Mustang, Oklahoma)
 3rd Battalion/381st Regiment (Grand Prairie, Texas)
 Atlantic Training Division (Fort Dix, NJ)
 Great Lakes Training Division (Fort Sheridan, IL)
 Pacific Training Division (Camp Parks, Dublin, CA)

References

Notes

Sources
 Stanley Christopherson (James Holland, ed.), An Englishman at War: The Wartime Diaries of Stanley Christopherson, DSO, MC, TD, London: Bantam, 2014, .
 Richard Doherty, Hobart's 79th Armoured Division at War: Invention, Innovation and Inspiration, Barnsley: Pen & Sword, 2011, .
 
 Lt-Gen Sir Brian Horrocks, A Full Life, London: Collins, 1960.
here The Army Almanac: A Book of Facts Concerning the Army of the United States - U.S. Government Printing Office, 1950
US Army Reserve
Holocaust Encyclopedia

External links

GlobalSecurity: 84th Division

Fact Sheet of the 84th Infantry Division from http://www.battleofthebulge.org
Tried By Fire Part 1 Tried By Fire Part 2 Movie of 84th Division during the Battle of the Bulge, December 1944
 is the website of the 84th Railsplitters Association LTC, formerly the 84th Division Alumni Association. 

084th Infantry Division, U.S.
Military units and formations established in 1917
Infantry Division, U.S. 084
United States Army divisions of World War I
Infantry divisions of the United States Army in World War II